Yao Yao may refer to:

 Choi Hyo-joo, born Yao Yao, Chinese-South Korean table tennis player
 Yuri Huang, stage name Yao Yao, Taiwanese artist
 Kuo Shu-yao, nickname Yao Yao, Taiwanese actress and singer

See also
 Yaoyao, a playable character voiced by Mai Kadowaki in Genshin Impact.